Group 4 of the 1974 FIFA World Cup was contested  between 15 and 23 June 1974.  This group is played on two sites: Munich and Stuttgart.

The pool is seeded by Italy (Pot 1-Western Europe) accompanied by Poland (Pot 2-Eastern Europe), Argentina (Pot 3-South America), and Haiti (Pot 4-Rest of the world).

Standings

Matches
All times listed are local (CET)

Italy vs Haiti

Poland vs Argentina

Argentina vs Italy

Haiti vs Poland

Argentina vs Haiti

Poland vs Italy

References

External sources
 Italy-Haiti game report
 Haiti-Poland, game report

1974 FIFA World Cup
Italy at the 1974 FIFA World Cup
Argentina at the 1974 FIFA World Cup
Haiti at the 1974 FIFA World Cup
Poland at the 1974 FIFA World Cup